The Loiret is a  long river in France, a left tributary to the Loire. Its waters come from infiltrations from the Loire.

Its course is completely within the Loiret département, to which it gives its name.

The Loiret, south of Orléans, with its picturesque former mills, is a popular destination for walking and boating trips. The source of the Loiret is a feature of the Parc Floral de la Source (Le Bouillon), and its mouth in Saint-Hilaire-Saint-Mesmin, southwest of Orléans.

References

Rivers of France
Rivers of Loiret
Rivers of Centre-Val de Loire